BritishJET was a trading name for the tour operator Malta Bargains Limited based in Malta.  It operated inclusive tour charter flights from Malta International Airport.

The company held a United Kingdom Civil Aviation Authority (CAA) Air Travel Organiser's Licence (ATOL2077).

History 
The operation was established on 29 September 2004, when Malta Bargains Limited (previously Malta Sun Holidays) a travel agent specialising in Maltese holidays for British tourists, was licensed by the UK CAA as a tour operator. Services started with a flight between London Gatwick and Malta on 1 May 2005 and then to other UK airports.

Liquidation 
In 2008 BritishJET ceased operations as their contract with Malta Bargains ended. Air Malta became Malta Bargains' carrier of passengers between the UK and Malta.

Destinations 

BritishJET served the following destinations:

Malta
Luqa (Malta International Airport) Base
United Kingdom 
England
Birmingham (Birmingham International Airport)
Bristol (Bristol International Airport)
East Midlands (East Midlands Airport)
Exeter (Exeter International Airport)
Leeds/Bradford (Leeds Bradford International Airport)
London
(Gatwick Airport)
(Stansted Airport)
Manchester (Manchester Airport)
Newcastle upon Tyne (Newcastle Airport)
Norwich (Norwich International Airport)
Scotland
Glasgow (Glasgow International Airport)
Wales
Cardiff (Cardiff Airport)

Fleet 
The BritishJET fleet consisted of the following aircraft (at March 2007):

1 McDonnell Douglas MD-90-30

The aircraft was leased from and operated on its behalf by the Swiss airline Hello. The MD-90 was configured with leather seats in five abreast (2+3) seating.

References

External links

British Jet (Archive)
Fleet

Defunct companies of Malta
Companies established in 2004
Companies disestablished in 2008
Travel and holiday companies of the United Kingdom